Planorbis intermixtus is a species of gastropod belonging to the family Planorbidae.

The species is found in Turkey, Iran, North India.

References

Planorbidae